Tupac: Live at the House of Blues is a live album and the final concert by American rapper Tupac. The performance was recorded at the House of Blues, Sunset Strip, West Hollywood, California, July 4, 1996 and was released on both CD and DVD on September 5, 2005.

Background

Although the album is credited to 2Pac, the concert was in fact a joint show with Snoop Dogg and tha Dogg Pound. The concert was divided into two halves: Throughout the first half 2Pac, backed by his hip-hop-clique, the Outlawz, performs and features R&B duo, K-Ci & JoJo, while in the second half, Snoop Dogg goes back and forth with tha Dogg Pound and features West Coast singer, Nate Dogg. For the shows climax, 2Pac rejoins the stage and he and Snoop perform their then recent hit, "2 of Amerikaz Most Wanted".

Of the songs performed by 2Pac, three of them, at that time, were unreleased and would not see a release until years after his death. The unreleased songs performed were "Troublesome", "Tattoo Tears" and "Never Call U Bitch Again." Tha Dogg Pound also performed an unreleased song, "Me in Your World", which would see a release later the same year on Death Row Greatest Hits.
Since its release Tupac: Live at the House of Blues has sold over a million copies and is certified Platinum.

The DVD and Blu-ray edition contains the entire uncut concert and includes five full-length music videos; "California Love (Remix)", "To Live & Die in L.A.", "Hit 'Em Up", "How Do You Want It" and "I Ain't Mad at Cha."

Track listing

Charts
Album

Certifications

References

Concert films
Live albums published posthumously
Live video albums
2005 live albums
2005 video albums
Albums recorded at the House of Blues
Tupac Shakur live albums
Tupac Shakur video albums
Death Row Records live albums
Death Row Records video albums
Video albums published posthumously
Live gangsta rap albums